The 1997 Save Mart Supermarkets 300 was the ninth stock car race of the 1997 NASCAR Winston Cup Series, the third race of the 1997 NASCAR Winston West Series, and the ninth iteration of the event. The race was held on Sunday, May 4, 1997, in Sonoma, California, at the Grand Prix layout of Sears Point Raceway, a  permanent road course layout. The race took the scheduled 74 laps to complete. At race's end, Roush Racing driver Mark Martin would dominate the majority of the race to take his 19th career NASCAR Winston Cup Series victory and his first victory of the season. To fill out the top three, Jeff Gordon and Terry Labonte, both driving for Hendrick Motorsports, would finish second and third, respectively.

Background 

Sears Point Raceway is one of two road courses to hold NASCAR races, the other being Watkins Glen International. The Chute was only used for NASCAR events such as this race, and was criticized by many drivers, who preferred the full layout.

Entry list 

 (R) denotes rookie driver.

Qualifying 
Qualifying was split into two rounds. The first round was held on Friday, May 3, at 6:00 PM EST. Each driver would have one lap to set a time. During the first round, the top 25 drivers in the round would be guaranteed a starting spot in the race. If a driver was not able to guarantee a spot in the first round, they had the option to scrub their time from the first round and try and run a faster lap time in a second round qualifying run, held on Saturday, May 4, at 1:00 PM EST. As with the first round, each driver would have one lap to set a time. Positions 26-38 would be decided on time, and depending on who needed it, the 39th thru either the 42nd, 43rd, or 44th position would be based on provisionals. Four spots are awarded by the use of provisionals based on owner's points. The fifth is awarded to a past champion who has not otherwise qualified for the race. If no past champion needs the provisional, the field would be limited to 42 cars. If a champion needed it, the field would expand to 43 cars. If the race was a companion race with the NASCAR Winston West Series, four spots would be determined by NASCAR Winston Cup Series provisionals, while the final two spots would be given to teams in the Winston West Series, leaving the field at 44 cars.

13 drivers would fail to qualify: Rick Mast, Joe Nemechek, R. K. Smith, Robert Pressley, Chad Little, Gary Smith, David Green, Dick Trickle, Chuck Pruett, Bill McAnally, Scott Gaylord, Wayne Jacks, and Rick Scribner.

Full qualifying results 

*Time not available.

Race results

References 

1997 NASCAR Winston Cup Series
NASCAR races at Sonoma Raceway
May 1997 sports events in the United States
1997 in sports in California